is the second album under an independent label by Saori Atsumi.

Track listing

Notes and references

a: [sic] ノスタルジー is derived from the French/German word nostalgie, which means nostalgia in English.

2006 albums
Saori Atsumi albums
Being Inc. albums